Oberea lacana is a species of beetle in the family Cerambycidae. It was described by Maurice Pic in 1923.

References

Beetles described in 1923
lacana